Be Well is an American hardcore punk band, formed in 2019 in Baltimore, Maryland. The group included members from Bane, Only Crime, Darkest Hour, Fairweather, Ashes, Battery, Olympia, Beasts of No Nation, and Converge. The group signed to Equal Vision Records in December 2019 and released an album, The Weight and the Cost, in August 2020.

Band members 
 Brian McTernan – lead vocals (2019–present)
 Aaron Dalbec – bass (2019–present)
 Shane Johnson – drums (2019–present)
 Mike Schleibaum – guitar (2019–present)
 Peter Tsouras – guitar (2019–present)

Studio albums

Extended plays

References

External links 
Be Well on Bandcamp

Musical groups from Baltimore
Equal Vision Records artists
Musical groups established in 2019
2019 establishments in Maryland
End Hits Records artists